Twin Township is one of the twenty townships of Darke County, Ohio, United States. The 2010 census found 4,060 people in the township, 1,587 of whom lived in the unincorporated portions of the township.

Geography
Located in the southern part of the county, it borders the following townships:
Van Buren Township - north
Franklin Township - northeast corner
Monroe Township - east
Harrison Township, Preble County - south
Monroe Township, Preble County - southwest corner
Butler Township - west
Neave Township - northwest corner

Three incorporated villages are located in Twin Township:
Arcanum, in the north
Gordon, in the southeast
Ithaca, in the south

Name and history
Statewide, other Twin Townships are located in Preble and Ross counties.

Twin Township was established in 1817 from land given by Greenville Township. The township takes its name from Twin Creek.

Government
The township is governed by a three-member board of trustees, who are elected in November of odd-numbered years to a four-year term beginning on the following January 1. Two are elected in the year after the presidential election and one is elected in the year before it. There is also an elected township fiscal officer, who serves a four-year term beginning on April 1 of the year after the election, which is held in November of the year before the presidential election. Vacancies in the fiscal officership or on the board of trustees are filled by the remaining trustees.  The current trustees are Mike Schweiterman, Jerry Snyder and Wayne Stutz, and the clerk is Deborah Dynes.

References

External links
County website

Townships in Darke County, Ohio
Townships in Ohio